The second Lebanese government after independence and the second under President Bechara El Khoury, who was commissioned to form it by Decree No. 1484 of 3 July 1944 , and the government was formed by Decree No. 1485 on the same date of the assignment. The cabinet resigned on 9 January 1945 .

Source: Legallaw.lb

Sources

1944 establishments in Lebanon
1945 disestablishments in Lebanon
Cabinets of Lebanon
Cabinets established in 1944
Cabinets disestablished in 1945